Anwar Hussain is a retired 3 Star General of the Bangladesh Army. He has served as the Quarter Master General of the Army. He is the former Director General of Border Guards Bangladesh  (BGB) and General officer Commanding (GOC) of Army Training and Doctrine Command (ARTDOC). He has been honored as the Colonel Commandant of Regiment of Artillery of Bangladesh Army as he is the highest Ranking and senior longest serving officer of Regiment of Artillery of Bangladesh Army.

Education 
He completed the Army Staff Course from Defence Services Command and Staff College, Mirpur in 1991, the Command and General Staff Course at Staff College Germany in 1992-93 and the National Defence Course from National Defence College, Mirpur in 2006.

Career
Hussain was commissioned in the Artillery Corps of Bangladesh Army on 23 December 1979 from the 1st BMA long course.

During his long tenure he served as Commander of 9th Artillery Brigade, Commandant of Artillery Centre and School (AC&S), Director of a Directorate under General Staff Branch at Army Headquarters and GOC of 33 Infantry Division and Area Commander of Comilla Area. He served as General officer Commanding of Army Training and Doctrine Command.

He served as Director General of Border Guards Bangladesh from 30 June 2011 to 5 December 2012. During his tenure as BGB chief, the Coordinated Border Management Plan (CBMP) to reduce killings and crime along the common frontier and to further enhance the quality of border management was signed between BGB & BSF.

He was the Vice Chairman of the Bangladesh Diesel Plant Limited Board of Directors, an enterprise of Bangladesh Army. He also served as the Vice Chairman of the Board of Directors of Bangladesh Machine tools Factory limited . He was the Chairman of the Board of Directors of Canteen Stores Department (CSD). All DOHS and AHS comes under his authority as he was the Quarter Master General (QMG) of Bangladesh Army.

UN Mission 
In 1988-89 Anwar Hussain served as an observer of United Nations Iran-Iraq Military Observer Group (UNIIMOG) in 1988-89 and as Chief Military Observer of UN Observer Mission in Georgia (UNOMIG) in 2008–09.

References

Living people
Bangladesh Army generals
Director Generals of Border Guards Bangladesh
Year of birth missing (living people)